Princess Dollie Aur Uska Magic Bag (trans: Princess Dollie and her magic bag) is an Indian teen fantasy adventure television series produced by Sagar Films (Pvt.Ltd.) for Star Plus channel.

The show initially started as teen drama Hello Dollie starring Karishma Randhawa and Mayank Anand.

Cast
 Karishma Randhawa as Princess Dollie Suri
 Mayank Anand as Nikshay Rana
 Rahil Azam as Hatim
 Vinod Singh as Ali Baba
 Vaquar Shaikh as Sinbad the Sailor
 Nirmal Pandey as a mysterious king
 Akhil Mishra as  the mysterious King's henchman
 Tej Sapru as an evil magician
 Asrani as a sad king
 Rushali as Laira
 Karan Singh Grover as Aman
 Benaf Dadachandji as Lopa
 Malavika Rane as Trishala
 Anirudh Pratap as Sid
 Suhasini Mulay as Queen of Suryavansh
 Sharad Malhotra as Prince Goldy
 KK Goswami as Dwarf

References

External links 
Hello Dollie Official Site on STAR Plus
Princess Dollie Aur Uska Magic Bag on STAR Utsav

Indian children's television series
StarPlus original programming
Television shows based on fairy tales
Works based on One Thousand and One Nights
2004 Indian television series debuts
2005 Indian television series endings
Indian fantasy television series
Indian teen drama television series